13 Comae Berenices is a probable binary star system in the northern constellation of Coma Berenices. It has an apparent visual magnitude of 5.17, which is bright enough to be faintly visible to the naked eye. With an annual parallax shift of 12.33 mas, it is located around 260 light years from the Sun. It is member of the nearby Coma Star Cluster (Melotte 111).

Based on measured changes in the star's motion, this is most likely an astrometric binary system. The visible component is an A-type main-sequence star with a stellar classification of A3 V. It is catalogued as an Alpha2 Canum Venaticorum variable with the designation GN Com. Rensom (1990) listed it as a suspected Am star. The system is a source of X-ray emission, which may be coming from the companion.

References

A-type main-sequence stars
Coma Berenices
Comae Berenices, 13
Durchmusterung objects
107966
060514
4717
Comae Berenices, GN